ZingZillas is a British television programme aimed at young children, broadcast on the BBC pre-school channel CBeebies, which ran from 5 April 2010 to 11 June 2012.

Overview
ZingZillas is a music show aimed at children ages six and under.
It is set on a monkey-shaped tropical island where everyone joins in to create music magic. They use musical influences from all over the globe from rock to soul, jazz to samba, big band to orchestra.

A yellow submarine is sometimes seen in the sea near the island. One episode contains what appears to be a view from the submarine through its periscope. In a recently started five-minute version called Zingzillas Zingbop, the submarine goes very near the viewpoint, showing children inside the submarine through its portholes; those children later take part in the programme's singing and dancing session, as if (in the world of the story) the submarine is the usual transport for guests to and from the island.

The main characters are primates: Zak, Tang, Panzee and the youngest, Drum. They are mentored by music guru DJ Loose and they create their unique ZingZilla sound just in time for their daily performance which is called 'The Big Zing'. A coconut clock counts down the time to the island's fireworks eruption that signals the start of the Big Zing and breaks each programme into four parts.

In every episode from series 3, they wake up and ask Todd for an idea for the day's song. Todd uses his ideas machine but it always breaks down, or other things happen. They are visited by a different musical guest. The ZingZillas always discover their musical guests in a 'glade' in the jungle and they take inspiration from these guests, incorporating them and their sounds into The Big Zing, where they wear a cool cape, a feather boa, a groovy hat and wings.

Original music for the series has been composed by Banks & Wag.

On Monday, 30 August 2010, "Do You Didgeridoo?" was released on an EP, alongside the "ZingZillas Theme Tune" and "Bhangra Beat", reaching #1 in the iTunes Children's Chart.

On Monday 4 October 2010, "ZingZillas: The Album" was released on CD and as a digital download, reaching #1 in the iTunes Children's Chart on the first day. The recording features guest tracks by musical luminaries who have appeared on the show including cellist Julian Lloyd Webber flautist James Galway and jazz vocalist Cleo Laine.

On 28 February 2011 CBeebies began broadcasting a 20 part series of five-minute spinoff programmes entitled "Zingzillas Zingbop" which is hosted by DJ Loose, where a small group of children (known as Zingboppers) go to Zingzilla Island and are taught to dance to a Zingzillas song. The Zingboppers then participate in the final Zingbop. Every Zingbop performed is of course "the best Zingbop ever".

On 11 June 2012, ZingZillas aired its last-ever episode "Picnic Day" before ceasing operations for good.

Characters
Each ZingZilla has their own personality:
 Zak has a positive attitude. He is serious, confident and likes taking risks. He is a gorilla who is the lead singer, played by Jeremiah Krage and Jack Andrews and has purple fur. He is voiced by Michael Offei.
 Tang thinks creatively and is never afraid of asking for help whenever there's a problem. He is an orangutan who plays guitars (acoustic & electric) and backing vocals. He is played by Nick Kellington and voiced by Gary Jordan.
 Panzee loves to dress up. She is sensitive, fun and always ready to try something new. She is a chimpanzee who plays bass, keyboards and backing vocals, played by Victoria Bovingdon and voiced by Sarah-Jane Honeywell.
 Drum is very young at heart. She loves exploring sounds and enjoys making rhythms and noise. She is very sensitive to the mood of music. She is a monkey who plays drums, percussion and backing vocals, is played by Rachelle Beinart, Cecily Fay and Amy Collins and her voice is by Penni Tovey.

Other characters 

 Todd is the 'father figure'. Helpful, inventive, accident-prone and loveable. He is a mandrill and has a ideas machine that always breaks down, Todd is performed and voiced by Aiden Cook.
 Auntie Dot is a relation of Todd. She is voiced by Penni Tovey.
 DJ Loose is the island's sloth DJ. He plays the ZingZillas music made by real people in the glade. DJ Loose is Puppeteered and voiced by Mark Jefferis and Josh Elwell.
 The Beach Byrds (Maxine, Patti and Laverne) are tropical birds who work in the coconut hut and say everything tunefully.
 The Moaning Stones are similar to the standing moai heads on Easter Island. Although four are shown, only the middle pair called Granite and Gravel talk.

Episodes & guest performers

Series Overview

Series 1 (2010)

Series 2 (2010)

Series 3 (2011–2012)

Series 4 (2012)

DVD releases

Welcome to the Island 
This DVD contains five episodes (note that it's not the first five of the series, although there's a lot of overlap):

 Didgeridoo Hullabaloo (Series 1, Episode 1)
 Operatic Todd (Series 1, Episode 6)
 Rock Guitar (Series 1, Episode 3)
 Auntie Dot’s Dash (Series 1, Episode 4)
 A Great Place to Live (Series 1, Episode 11)

Extras: Musical instrument game and character profile.

World Music Tour
This DVD contains five episodes:

 Bhangra Beats (Series 1, Episode 8)
 Welcome Beach Byrds (Series 1, Episode 14)
 Keep Your Castanets (Series 1, Episode 17)
 Disappearing Drum (Series 1, Episode 16)
 Bam-Boo! (Series 2, Episode 3)

Extras: Interactive game

References

External links
 

ZingZillas official website
Banks & Wag official website
Do You Didgeridoo? EP

2010 British television series debuts
2012 British television series endings
2010s British children's television series
BBC children's television shows
British preschool education television series
British television shows featuring puppetry
2010s preschool education television series
CBeebies
English-language television shows
Television series by BBC Studios
Television series about monkeys
British children's musical groups